Sir Fielding Ould (1710–29 November 1789)  was an Irish doctor and medical writer.

Ould was the son of British Army Captain Abraham Ould (1689–1715) and a Miss Shawe of Galway, in which city he was born. He studied in Paris and settled in Golden Lane, Dublin as a medical practitioner in 1736. He published an enormously influential treatise on midwifery in 1742, although it was criticized for a number of factual errors.

An obstetrician, he acquired a huge practice and was master of the Rotunda Hospital (the Dublin lying-in hospital). After a lengthy battle, he was eventually granted his licence as a physician. In 1759 he was knighted for services to the medical profession. He died of apoplexy at his home on South Frederick Street and was buried at St. Ann's Churchyard, Dawson Street.

He had at least two children, including William, who was chaplain of the Rotunda Hospital. Later descendants included the painter Sir Fielding Fielding-Ould, and the noted architect William Vitruvius Morrison.

Bibliography
 A Treatise of Midwifry, in three parts, Dublin, 1742

References
Notes

Sources
 

People from County Galway
1710 births
1789 deaths
Irish obstetricians
Medical doctors from Dublin (city)
18th-century Irish medical doctors